Daedeoksan  is a mountain of Jeollabuk-do, western South Korea. It has an elevation of 1,290 metres.

See also
List of mountains of Korea

References

Mountains of South Korea
Mountains of North Jeolla Province
Mountains of North Gyeongsang Province
One-thousanders of South Korea